Mikey Perry, better known by his stage name Paces, is an Australian record producer and musician. His debut studio album, Vacation, was released in March 2016 and received positive reviews. Paces toured the album across Australia and New Zealand throughout May and June 2016.

Paces has produced tracks for Tkay Maidza, Safia, Kilter, Danny T, Rattraps, Sietta, Parachute Youth, YesYou and Sampology.

Discography

Albums

Singles

Awards and nominations

AIR Awards
The Australian Independent Record Awards (commonly known informally as AIR Awards) is an annual awards night to recognise, promote and celebrate the success of Australia's Independent Music sector.

|-
| AIR Awards of 2019
|Zag
| Best Independent Dance/Electronic Album
| 
|-

References

External links
 
 

21st-century Australian musicians
Australian electronic musicians
Australian house musicians
Electro musicians
Living people
Musicians from Gold Coast, Queensland
21st-century Australian male musicians
Year of birth missing (living people)